Shiver and Shake was a British comic magazine published every Monday by IPC Magazines Ltd. It ran from (issue dates) 10 March 1973 to 5 October 1974, when it merged with Whoopee! As often happens with British comics, many names of strips were a play on popular television programmes and films of the time. The theme of the strips were mainly horror (albeit of a comic nature); similar to the later Monster Fun; indeed, Frankie Stein appeared in both comics. 

In an idea borrowed from the successful Whizzer and Chips, it was two comics in one; Shake being a pull-out section from Shiver. The main star of Shiver was a ghost of the same name, while the eponymous Shake was an elephant. Both had their own strips in their respective sections (The Duke's Spook and Shake). In 1973, the comic also featured a one-page strip starring stand-up comedian Charlie Williams.

Shiver and Shake ran for 79 issues. It also had eight specials, from 1973 to 1980, and 13 annuals, from 1974 to 1986.

Shiver strips
 Adrian's Wall
 Biddy's Beastly Bloomers
 Creepy Car
 Frankie Stein by Ken Reid (originally from Wham!)
 The Ghost's Revenge
 Ghoul Getters Ltd
 Ghouldilocks
 Grimly Feendish by Leo Baxendale (originally from Smash! — although the character first appeared in Wham! — the first eleven issues of Shiver and Shake reprinted stories from Smash! but then new adventures began, lasting until issue #77).
 The Hand
 Hire a Horror (from Cor!!)
 Horrornation Street
 Scream Inn
 The Shiver Givers
 Soggy the Sea Monster
 Sweeny Toddler
 Webster
 Ye Haunted Lake

Shake strips
 Blunder Puss
 Damsel in Distress
 The Desert Fox
 Gal Capone
 Jail Birds
 Lolly Pop
 Moana Lisa
 Riddle Me Ray
 Sample Simon
 Sports School
 Tough Nutt and Softy Centre

References

Notes

Sources 
 

Fleetway and IPC Comics titles
1973 comics debuts
1974 comics endings
Magazines established in 1973
Magazines disestablished in 1974
Comics magazines published in the United Kingdom
Defunct British comics
British humour comics
Horror comics
Weekly magazines published in the United Kingdom